Bous is a municipality in the district of Saarlouis, in Saarland, Germany. It is situated on the river Saar, approx. 5 km southeast of Saarlouis, and 15 km west of Saarbrücken.

Sister cities
 Koulikoro, Mali
 Quétigny, France

References

Saarlouis (district)